Greatest of the Delta Blues Singers is the debut album by the American blues singer Skip James, released in 1965. It was his first album released after his rediscovery in 1964.

Background
James had recorded for the Paramount label in the 1930s without success. He was "rediscovered" in 1964 by the blues enthusiasts John Fahey, Bill Barth and Henry Vestine who found him in a hospital in Tunica, Mississippi.

Fahey and his partner in Takoma Records, ED Denson, signed James to a recording contract and he recorded at Gene Rosethal's basement studio in Silver Spring, Maryland. Because of legal issues concerning the rights to the songs, the recording was not released by Takoma. It was eventually released as She Lyin'.

The material for Greatest of the Delta Blues Singers was recorded in the home of the musicologist and author Richard K. Spottswood in December 1964 and completed in July 1965. It was released on Spottswood's Melodeon Records which was later sold to Biograph Records. Biograph reissued the material under the same title adding "Motherless & Fatherless", "Skip's Worried Blues", "Catfish Blues" and "Cypress Grove Blues". They also reissued the recordings with a different track order as A Tribute to Skip James and two other tracks from the 1964 sessions were included on King of the Delta Blues Singers. Biograph also released the material on CD as Hard Time Killing Floor Blues in 2003.

Reception

In his review for AllMusic, Jason Ankeny wrote: "Although his guitar skills have lost a step in the intervening years, the passage of time has only made James' vocals that much more expressive; his new material is especially devastating, in particular 'Sick Bed Blues' and 'Washington D.C. Hospital Center Blues', both detailing the fight with cancer that eventually led to his death."

Track listing

Personnel
Skip James – vocals, guitar, piano
Production notes:
Richard K. Spottswood – producer
Louisa Spottswood – producer
Pete Kuykendall – engineer
Bob O'Connell – cover drawing
Bob Turner – cover design
Ed Morris – liner notes

References

External links
Skip James illustrated discography

1965 debut albums
Skip James albums
Melodeon Records albums
Biograph Records albums